The 1975–76 season was Colchester United's 34th season in their history and their second consecutive season in third tier of English football, the Third Division. Alongside competing in the Third Division, the club also participated in the FA Cup and the League Cup.

With Jim Smith departing for Second Division Blackburn Rovers in the summer, his former Colchester United coach Bobby Roberts was appointed manager in his place. A succession of poor results spelt relegation for Colchester, while they exited both cup competitions in the first round.

Season overview
Jim Smith was prized away from Colchester by Second Division Blackburn Rovers over the summer. His coach Bobby Roberts was appointed manager but his early days in charge proved ominous for the remainder of the season. A winless first five games was only worsened by Smith returned to sign top scorer Bobby Svarc for £25,000 from the cash-strapped U's.

Colchester suffered defeat at the hands of non-League opposition in the FA Cup once again after being taken to a replay and then extra time by Dover. They were soundly beaten 4–1 at the end of extra time. They also lost out in the League Cup first round 4–3 on aggregate against Crystal Palace. Despite this, Colchester rallied for a mid-season resurgence of form to climb to twelfth position in the league table, but some crushing defeats including 6–1 at Chesterfield and 6–0 at Brighton & Hove Albion put the U's back in the relegation mire. Relegation was confirmed as Colchester finished 22nd position in the table, with Steve Leslie the club's top scorer with a record low of just six league goals.

Players

Transfers

In

 Total spending:  ~ £11,000

Out

 Total incoming:  ~ £38,000

Loans in

Match details

Third Division

Results round by round

League table

Matches

League Cup

FA Cup

Squad statistics

Appearances and goals

|-
!colspan="14"|Players who appeared for Colchester who left during the season

|}

Goalscorers

Disciplinary record

Clean sheets
Number of games goalkeepers kept a clean sheet.

Player debuts
Players making their first-team Colchester United debut in a fully competitive match.

See also
List of Colchester United F.C. seasons

References

General
Books

Websites

Specific

1975-76
English football clubs 1975–76 season